Mohd Ridzuan bin Abdunloh Pula (born 23 February 1994) is a Malaysian professional footballer.

Club career

Harimau Muda B
A product of Bukit Jalil Sport School, Ridzuan joins Harimau Muda B in 2011. Ridzuan scored goal in S.League against Warriors FC. He also scored twice against Tanjong Pagar United. In his first S.League season, Ridzuan was Harimau Muda B top scorers with seven goals.

Harimau Muda A
Ridzuan was promoted to Harimau Muda A for 2014 season. On 8 March 2014, he scored goal in a 3-3 draw against Moreton Bay United. On 24 May, he scored two goals in a 4-0 win against Western Pride.

Felda United
As Harimau Muda teams was disbanded in November 2015, Ridzuan was set to return to his state team, Kedah FA, but discovered that they already registered all their players for the next season, so Felda United made an agreement with Kedah for him to join them for the 2016 season.

Career statistics

References

1994 births
Living people
Malaysian footballers
People from Kedah
Singapore Premier League players
Felda United F.C. players
Expatriate footballers in Singapore
Expatriate soccer players in Australia
Association football midfielders